Vassily Maximovich Maximov (– ) was a Russian painter, a prominent member of the Peredvizhniki group.

Biography
Maximov was born to a peasant family in the village of Lopino in the Saint Petersburg Governorate, near Novaya Ladoga. He became an orphan early and worked for an Iconpainting shop, where he first learned to paint. In 1863 he entered the Imperial Academy of Arts and in 1864 he became a member of an Artel of Artists created by P.N. Krestonovtsev by the example of Ivan Kramskoi. The artel existed only one year and was then disbanded. Maximov painted the Sick Child (1864) at that time, when received a Gold Medal of the Academia.

He completed all the courses of the Academy in three years. In 1865 he (like the group of fourteen led by Ivan Kramskoi had done earlier) refused to take part in the competitions for the Major Gold Medal by Academia. He argued that he did not need to study abroad (that was a part of the prize) but rather would study the Russian village. Indeed, after graduation from the Academia he moved to the village of Shubino, in the gubernia of Tver, where he painted the peasant life, earning money as a painting teacher of the Princes Golenischev-Kutuzov (descendants of Mikhail Illarionovich Kutuzov).

His painting Grandmother's tales (1867) was shown at a Peredvizhniki exhibition, where it won a prize and was bought by Pavel Tretyakov. In 1872 he was admitted to the Peredvizhniki group, and soon became one of its most prominent and rigorous members. Ilya Yefimovich Repin described Maximov as "the most uncrushable stone in the foundation of peredvizhnechestvo". Maximov painted many paintings of the peasant life.

In the last twenty years of his life, realism paintings fell out of fashion. Maximov still painted almost exclusively scenes of the peasant lives that had almost no buyers. The artist lived a life full of poverty and illnesses. He died in Saint Petersburg.

Selected works

References

Biography at Старатель.com 

1844 births
1911 deaths
People from Volkhovsky District
People from Novoladozhsky Uyezd
Peredvizhniki
Russian male painters
Russian realist painters
19th-century painters from the Russian Empire
19th-century male artists from the Russian Empire
20th-century Russian male artists
20th-century Russian painters